The fourth series of Ross Kemp: Extreme World was broadcast on Sky One between 22 January and 5 March 2015.

Episodes

Ratings

References

Ross Kemp: Extreme World
2015 British television seasons